Alfred Lee Bulwinkle (April 21, 1883 – August 31, 1950) was a U.S. Representative from North Carolina.

Early life 
Born in Charleston, South Carolina, Bulwinkle moved with his parents to Dallas, North Carolina, in 1891.
He attended the common schools.
He studied law at the University of North Carolina at Chapel Hill.
He was admitted to the bar in 1904 and commenced practice in Dallas, North Carolina.
He served as prosecuting attorney for the municipal court of Gastonia 1913-1916.
He served as captain in Company B, First Infantry, North Carolina National Guard from 1909 to 1917.
He served on the Mexican border in 1916 and 1917.
During the First World War served as a major in command of the Second Battalion, One Hundred and Thirteenth Field Artillery, Fifty-fifth Brigade, Thirtieth Division, American Expeditionary Forces.

Political career 
Bulwinkle was elected as a Democrat to the Sixty-seventh and to the three succeeding Congresses (March 4, 1921 – March 3, 1929). He was an unsuccessful candidate for reelection in 1928 to the Seventy-first Congress, losing to Charles A. Jonas.

Two years later, Bulwinkle defeated Jonas and was elected to the Seventy-second Congress. He served in nine succeeding Congresses and served from March 4, 1931, until his death. He served as chairman of the Committee on Memorials (Seventy-sixth Congress). In 1938, he was key to passing the La Follette-Bulwinkle Act which sanctioned federal assistance to U.S. states establishing preventive healthcare for venereal diseases.

He served as delegate to the International Aviation Conference at Chicago, Illinois, in 1944. In 1947, he was the United States adviser, International Civil Aviation Organization at Montreal, Canada, and Geneva, Switzerland.

He died in Gastonia, North Carolina, August 31, 1950, of multiple myeloma.
He was interred in Oakwood Cemetery.

See also

 List of United States Congress members who died in office (1950–99)

References

External links

 Memorial services held in the House of Representatives together with remarks presented in eulogy of Alfred Lee Bulwinkle, late a representative from North Carolina

1883 births
1950 deaths
United States Army officers
Politicians from Charleston, South Carolina
People from Dallas, North Carolina
Democratic Party members of the United States House of Representatives from North Carolina
20th-century American politicians
Deaths from multiple myeloma